Rawil İsməğil ulı Ğaynetdin (born Ğaynetdinev, Гайнетдинев - ), born on August 25, 1959 in the village of Shali of Pestrechinsky District of the Tatar ASSR, Soviet Union to a Volga Tatar family. He has served as one of the Grand Muftis of Russia and the Chairman of the Russian Council of Muftis since July 1, 1996. He is one of the signatories of A Common Word Between Us and You, an open letter by Islamic scholars to Christian leaders, calling for peace and understanding.

Honours and awards

Honours

National honours
 Russia
  Russian Imperial Family: Knight Grand Cordon of the Imperial Order of Saint Stanislaus, Special Class
  Russian Imperial Family: Recipient of the 400th Anniversary Medal of the House of Romanov
 : Order of Merit to the Fatherland
 Grand Officer - 9 September 2019
 Commander - 23 March 2015
 Member - 11 August 2009
 : Member of the Decoration of Honour - 15 January 2004
 : Member of the Decoration of Friendship - 6 October 1997

Foreign honours
 : Recipient of the Commemorative Medal of "10 years of Astana"
 : Recipient of the Commemorative Medal of 20 Years of Independence
 : Commander of the Order of the Star of Jerusalem - 2015

Awards
 Presidential Certificate of Honour - 23 August 1999
 Russian Orthodox Church: Recipient of the Gold Medal for Peace and Charity - 2011

References

Notes

External links

 Official website of the Russian Council of Muftis.

Personalities :: Russia mufties Council :: Mufti Ravil Gaynutdin :: Russia mufties Council

1959 births
Living people
Russian religious leaders
Chief Muftis of Russia
Russian imams
Recipients of the Order "For Merit to the Fatherland"
Recipients of the Order "For Merit to the Fatherland", 2nd class
Recipients of the Order "For Merit to the Fatherland", 3rd class
Recipients of the Order "For Merit to the Fatherland", 4th class
Recipients of the Order of Honour (Russia)
Islam in Russia
Islam in Tatarstan
Russian Sunni Muslims
Tatar people of Russia
20th-century imams
21st-century imams
Members of the Civic Chamber of the Russian Federation
Volga Tatar people